Michael C. Chapman (born 1963) is an American customs inspector and politician serving as a Democratic member of the Washington State House of Representatives.

Political career 

Chapman was a County Commissioner for Clallam County, Washington from 2009 to 2017.

Chapman was first elected to the state legislature in 2016. He was reelected in 2018 and 2020. Chapman represents the 24th Legislative District, which includes Clallam and Jefferson counties as well as parts of Grays Harbor County.

Electoral record 

In 2018, Chapman and Jodi Wilke were the only candidates in the top-two primary for the District 24, Position 1 seat, so both advanced to the general election.

Personal life 

Chapman and his wife, Bobbi, have two sons, and live in Port Angeles, Washington.

Before becoming an elected official, Chapman worked as a US Customs Inspector.

References 

Living people
County commissioners in Washington (state)
Democratic Party members of the Washington House of Representatives
21st-century American politicians
1963 births